XHNC-FM is a radio station on 102.9 FM in Celaya, Guanajuato. XHNC is owned by Radiorama and carries a grupera format known as Fiesta Mexicana.

History
XHNC began as XENC-AM 1540. It received its concession in June 1943 and was originally owned by El Heraldo del Bajío, S. de R.L. In 1968, the concessionaire was changed to Radiodifusora Comercial XENC, S.A.

It migrated to FM in 2011 and changed concessionaires again in 2015.

References

Radio stations in Guanajuato
Radio stations established in 1943